Count Gustaf Carl Fredrik Löwenhielm (6 October 1771 – 29 July 1856) was a Swedish general and diplomat.

Biography
Löwenhielm was born  in Stockholm, Sweden. He was the son of Chancellor and diplomat  Fredrik Adolf Löwenhielm (1743-1810)  and Augusta von Fersen (1754–1846). He attended the University of Strasbourg from 1781–87. He participated with his regiment in the 1788–90. He was a cavalry inspector 1804–09, colonel and general adjutant in Pomerania and Saxony in 1805–06. In 1808, he was severely wounded at Pyhäjoki and fell into Russian captivity until his release in 1809.

He participated in the election of Charles XIV John of Sweden to the Swedish throne and served as his envoy to several foreign powers between 1810 until 1837 and as such participated in many important political events. He was also the director of the Royal Theatres (Royal Swedish Opera and the Royal Dramatic Theatre) in 1812-1818 and introduced several lasting reforms to its management.

References

Other sources
 Nils F Holm: Gustaf Löwenhielm i Svenskt biografiskt lexikon (1982-1984)

1771 births
1856 deaths
Ambassadors of Sweden to France
Swedish diplomats
Swedish Army generals
19th-century Swedish military personnel
Swedish courtiers
Swedish theatre directors